The Bleeding Edge is a 2018 Netflix original documentary film that investigates the $400 billion medical device industry.

Written and directed by Kirby Dick and produced by Amy Ziering and Amy Herdy, it premiered at the 2018 Tribeca Film Festival, where it was billed as "the stuff of dystopian nightmares". It was released on July 27, 2018 on Netflix.

Synopsis
In The Bleeding Edge, Academy Award-nominated investigative filmmakers Kirby Dick and Amy Ziering turn their sights on the $400 billion medical device industry; examining lax regulations, corporate cover-ups, and profit-driven incentives that put patients at risk daily. Weaving emotionally powerful stories of people whose lives have been irrevocably harmed, it asks: What lifesaving technologies may actually be killing us? According to the director: "Very few people know about the medical device industry and the fact that it is even less regulated than pharmaceuticals". The film explores the process of regulating medical devices and the impact felt on impacted patients.

The film primarily focuses on Bayer's permanent birth control device Essure, highlighting the device's failures that led to pain, discomfort, lost pregnancies, and death for multiple women. The documentary explores the FDA's 510(k) process which allows a medical device to be fast-tracked onto the market with less clinical study and human testing. The film also explores problems with hip replacement devices that can lead to cobalt poisoning and vaginal mesh devices that injured multiple women.

Reception

Critical reception
Upon its July 27, 2018 release, the film was chosen as the New York Times Pick of the Week, and Rotten Tomatoes indicated that  of critics gave the film positive reviews. Frank Scheck of The Hollywood Reporter called it "a terrifying eye-opener", and noted that "the film concludes by informing us that no one from the FDA or any of the companies involved agreed to be interviewed." Owen Gleiberman of Variety stated that "Kirby Dick's disturbingly powerful exposé nails a corporatized America." IndieWire predicted the film "stands a good chance at enlightening more people who have been (or might be) hoodwinked."

Flavorwire says the film "alternates history with the stories of those who are suffering under the side effects of a handful of poorly tested devices, and their descriptions of their conditions are visceral, scary, and horrifying, accumulating in a film that's hard to watch and harder to ignore." April Wolfe of The Village Voice analyzed how Amy Ziering and Kirby Dick continue their "legacy of equally infuriating and enlightening documentaries", while the Los Angeles Times declared that "The Bleeding Edge can already be called an agent for change."

Impact

A week before its release, The Bleeding Edge became a part of a national news story when Bayer removed the birth control device Essure from the U.S. market, one of the many devices the documentary heavily criticized. Entertainment Weekly promptly added it on their list of "documentaries that have changed the world".

The film quickly generated discussion in the medical industry. The website Medical Device and Diagnostic Industry noted that The Bleeding Edge "has rattled the medical device industry and left countless viewers speechless", while BMJ's Sexual and Reproductive Health Journal tweeted that the film was "an excellent, disturbing documentary about the need for better trials and evidence around medical devices, especially when it comes to women's health." Stat News quoted a neurosurgeon who stated that the film made him "wonder what the misuse of medical technology means for patients and for doctors" and led him to "believe we need a change of culture to avoid overuse of procedures or misuse of drugs and devices." The Mike on Medtech podcast called the film a "mandatory watch for everybody working in the medical device industry", and Healthcare Analytics News noted that it "inspired anger among those inside and outside healthcare, prompting calls for change."

Awards and nominations

References

External links
, "The Bleeding Edge"

2010s English-language films
2010s American films
2018 films
American documentary films
Bayer
Netflix original documentary films
Films directed by Kirby Dick
Films scored by Jeff Beal
Regulation of medical devices